Michelle Alicia Saram (born 12 December 1974) is a Singaporean actress & singer.

Education
Saram was educated at CHIJ Katong Convent, Temasek Junior College and Nanyang Technological University where she majored in Mass Communications. She was awarded the Nanyang Outstanding Young Alumni Award by her alma mater in 2006.

Career
Saram joined the entertainment industry after co-starring in an ad for One2Free with Hong Kong star Aaron Kwok. She joined MediaCorp and won the Top 10 Most Popular Female Artistes award twice. She has also starred in foreign drama series such Taiwanese series Meteor Garden and in several Hong Kong dramas.

She is one of the few actresses who have played leading roles in Singapore, Taiwan, and Hong Kong television serials.

Saram left the industry to concentrate on running her food and beverage business.

16 years later, she collaborated with Louis Koo in Paradox.

Shortly after, Saram left the industry again to concentrate on running her food and beverage business.

She is set to appear in the upcoming film Back to the Past.

Personal life
Saram's father was Indian, and her mother was Chinese.

She is married to Ajai Lauw-Zecha, a Chinese Indonesian socialite and the son of businessman Adrian Lauw-Zecha, founder of Aman Resorts and a scion of the Lauw-Sim-Zecha family, part of the Cabang Atas or Chinese gentry of colonial Indonesia.
After she married him, she decided to retire as an actress and to focus solely on her marriage life.

Filmography

Television

Film

Accolades

References

External links

Michelle Saram Fan Site

1974 births
Living people
Lauw-Sim-Zecha family
Cabang Atas
Singaporean people of Chinese descent
Singaporean people of Indian descent
Temasek Junior College alumni
Nanyang Technological University alumni
Singaporean born Hong Kong artists